In United States law, the Frye standard, Frye test, or general acceptance test is a judicial test used in U.S. courts to determine the admissibility of scientific evidence. It provides that expert opinion based on a scientific technique is admissible only when the technique is generally accepted as reliable in the relevant scientific community. In Daubert v. Merrell Dow Pharmaceuticals, 509 U.S. 579 (1993), the U.S. Supreme Court held that the Federal Rules of Evidence superseded Frye as the standard for admissibility of expert evidence in federal courts.  Some states, however, still adhere to the Frye standard.

History
This standard comes from Frye v. United States, 293 F. 1013 (D.C. Cir. 1923), a case discussing the admissibility of systolic blood pressure deception test as evidence.  The Court in Frye held that expert testimony must be based on scientific methods that are sufficiently established and accepted. The court wrote:

In many but not all jurisdictions, the Frye standard has been superseded by the Daubert standard. States still following Frye include: California, Illinois, Minnesota, New Jersey, New York, Pennsylvania, and Washington.

On May 23, 2019, the Florida Supreme Court accepted the Daubert standard.

Effective July 1, 2014, Kansas adopted Daubert and no longer follows the Frye standard.

Maryland's Court of Appeals adopted the Daubert standard on August 28, 2020, in Rochkind v. Stevenson.

Definition 
The court must determine that the scientific evidence is "generally accepted" by a significant portion of the relevant scientific community in order for it to satisfy the Frye standard. This pertains to any methods, ideas, or strategies that could be used during a court case.

In practical application of this standard, those who were proponents of a widely disputed scientific issue had to provide a number of experts to speak to the validity of the science behind the issue in question.

Novel techniques, placed under the scrutiny of this standard, forced courts to examine papers, books and judicial precedents on the subject at hand to make determinations as to the reliability and "general acceptance."

Commentary 
While Daubert has superseded Frye, the standard of Daubert is not substantially different.  While the focus of the inquiry has changed, the result rarely does.  Accordingly, the Daubert standard has been described as "Frye in drag."

Difficulty in the application of this standard has produced questions about whether or not the standard is flexible enough to adapt to truly new and novel scientific issues, where "general" or "widespread" acceptance may not yet be garnered. On the other hand, whether new and novel allegedly scientific issues are matters of relevance to the court has been questioned.

As an alternative to this standard, the courts have generally adopted Rule 702 of the Federal Rules of Evidence, as the primary for expert testimony and scientific evidence.

See also
Daubert standard, a later precedent for the admissibility of expert testimony
Objective historian

References

External links
 Admissibility of Scientific Evidence Under Daubert (compares the Daubert and Frye standards, and their usage in different parts of the U.S.)
 Frye, Frye, Again: The Past, Present, and Future of the General Acceptance Test

United States expert witness case law